The Wichita Falls Wildcats were a Tier II junior ice hockey team in the North American Hockey League's South Division.  The Wildcats played out of the 7,380-seat Kay Yeager Coliseum in Wichita Falls, Texas. After failing to find a buyer, the Wildcats ceased operations for the 2017–18 season.

History
Previously known as the Wichita Falls Rustlers (and before this, the Butte Irish of Butte, Montana and the Vail Avalanche of Vail, Colorado), the franchise was a part of the American Frontier/America West Hockey League prior to 2003, and became an NAHL team after the two leagues merged for the 2003–04 season. The Irish, Rustlers, and Wildcats are technically three separate franchises, but with a major overlap of players and coaches between the organizations, they are often listed together as one.

After 13 seasons as the Wildcats, ownership had been trying to sell the franchise to keep it in Wichita Falls during the 2016–17 season. After failing to find a buyer, they announced they would not be operating the team in the 2017–18 season.

In 2018, there was an attempt to bring junior hockey back to Wichita Falls with the Wichita Falls Force, a team in the USA Central Hockey League, but the entire league folded after only six weeks of operation. The NAHL later announced a Wichita Falls expansion team for the 2020–21 season.

Season-by-season records

Notable alumni
 Andrew Conboy – drafted by the Montreal Canadiens (NHL) in 2007
 Chad Costello – ECHL Most Valuable Player in 2011–12, 2015–16, and 2016–17.
 Evan Cowley – drafted by Florida Panthers (NHL) in 2013
 Cal Heeter – played one game with the Philadelphia Flyers (NHL)
 Tucker Poolman – drafted by the Winnipeg Jets (NHL) in 2013
 Dan Sexton – played for the Anaheim Ducks (NHL) and several teams in the Kontinental Hockey League
 Zach Trotman – drafted by the Boston Bruins (NHL) in 2010; has played for the Bruins and Pittsburgh Penguins

References

External links
Official site
NAHL website

North American Hockey League teams
Sports in Wichita Falls, Texas
Ice hockey teams in Texas
Ice hockey clubs established in 2002
2002 establishments in Texas